Hypseleotris ejuncida, the slender gudgeon or slender carp gudgeon, is a species of fish in the family Eleotridae endemic to Australia, where it is only known to occur around Kimberley in Western Australia. Its favored habitat is rocky pools.

References

ejuncida
Freshwater fish of Western Australia
Kimberley (Western Australia)
Taxonomy articles created by Polbot
Fish described in 1982